Gabri  may refer to:

 Gabri, Iran, a village in Qazvin Province
 Zoroastrian Dari language, referred to pejoratively as Gabri

People
 Gabri (footballer, born 1979) (Gabriel Francisco García de la Torre), Spanish football midfielder and manager
 Gabri (footballer, born 1985) (Gabriel Gómez Román), Spanish football forward
 Gabri (footballer, born 1993) (Gabri Izquier), Spanish football defender
 Gabri Cardozo (born 1997), Uruguayan football defender
 Gabri Martínez (born 2003), Spanish football forward
 Gabri Veiga (born 2002), Spanish football midfielder